This is a list of women artists who were born in Lebanon or whose artworks are closely associated with that country.

A
Layal Abboud (born 1982), singer, entertainer, poet, dancer, model
Cyrine Abdelnour (born 1977), singer, actress, model.
Zeina Abirached (born 1981), illustrator, graphic novelist, comics artist
Etel Adnan (1925–2021), painter, writer
Nancy Ajram (born 1983), singer, television guide
Suzanne Alaywan (born 1974), poet, painter
Nour Ardakani (born 2001), singer, dancer, model
Zena Assi (born 1974), painter

B
Lara Baladi (born 1969), photographer, multimedia artist
Mouna Bassili Sehnaoui (born 1945), painter, writer
Reem Bassous (born 1978), artist
Carla Nazih al-Berkashi (born 1983), singer
Julia Boutros, (born 1968), singer

C
Huguette Caland (1931–2019), painter, sculptor, fashion designer, based in Los Angeles
Youmna Chlala, contemporary artist, writer
Saloua Raouda Choucair (1916–2017), painter, sculptor

D

 Annabel Daou (born 1975), singer
 Grace Deeb (born 1967), performance artist, sculptor
Maya Diab  (born 1980), singer, entertainer, actress, television personality

F
Derrie Fakhoury (born 1930), painter, medallist
Myriam Fares (born 1983), singer dancer, actress, entertainer
Janet Feghali (1927–2014), singer, actress
Sabine Foushou (born 1988), musician

G
Mai Ghoussoub (born 1952), writer, artist, human rights activist
Laure Ghorayeb (born 1931), poet, art critic, author

H 

Diana Haddad (born 1976), singer, television personality
Joumana Haddad (born 1970), poet, human rights activist
Nouhad Haddad (born 1934), singer
Joana Hadjithomas (born 1969), filmmakers, artists
Darine Hadchiti (born 1983), pop singer
Nada El Hage (born 1958), poet, writer
Rana Hamadeh (born 1983) artist
Yasmine Hamdan (born 1976), singer, songwriter, actress
 Dina Hayek (born 1982), singer
Maritta El Helani (born 1958), poet, writer
Amal Hijazi (born 1997), singer, composer, songwriter 
Dominique Hourani (born 1985), recording artist, actress, beauty queen.
 Mona Hatoum (born 1952), Palestinian installation artist.
 May Hariri (born 1968), singer, actress
 Katia Harb (born 1976), singer

J
Ghada Jamal (born 1955), painter
Lamia Joreige (born 1972), visual artist, filmmaker
Emily Jacir (born 1972), artist, filmmaker

K
Najwa Karam (born 1966), singer, songwriter, fashion icon
Mireille Kassar (born 1963), contemporary artist
Dorothy Salhab Kazemi (born 1942), sculptor
Helen Khal (1923–2009), painter, writer, editor
 Dalida Khalil (born 1987), actress, singer
Zena El Khalil (born 1976), contemporary artist, writer, activist
Elissar Khoury (born 1972), singer, recording artist
Joelle Khoury (born 1963), pianist, jazz and contemporary classical music composer
Tania El Khoury (born 1982), live artist
Ferial Karim (1938–1988), actress, singer
Laura Khalil (born 1976), singer

L 
Nadine Labaki (born 1974), actress, director
Yolande Labaki (born 1927), painter

M 

 Pascale Machaalani (born 1969), singer
Seta Manoukian (born 1945), artist, painter
Mona Maraachli (born 1958), singer
Shakira Mebarak (born 1977), singer, dancer, songwriter
 May Murr (1929–2008), poet, writer

N 

 Emily Nasrallah (1931–2018), writer and women's rights activist
 Maya Nasri (born 1976), Lebanese singer
 Nadine Nassib Njeim (born 1984), actress, beauty queen
 Shirin Neshat (born 1957), Iranian visual artist

R
 Noura Rahal (born 1973), singer, actress
 Majida El Roumi (born in 1956), singer
 Dalida Rahmah (born in 1960), singer

S 
Rola Saad (born 1978), pop singer, model
Nicole Saba (born 1974), singer, actress
Karol Etienne Sakr (born 1969), singer
Nadia Saikali (born 1936), graphic artist
Carole Samaha (born 1972), singer, actress, performer  
Laurice Schehade (1908–2009), poet, novelist
Mouna Sehnaoui (born 1945), painter, writer and artist
Dolly Shahine (born 1985), Lebanese singer
Rania Stephan (born 1960), video artist, filmmaker
Najah Salam (born 1931), singer, actress
Carole Sakr (born 1969), singer
Pascale Sakr (born 1964), singer

T
 Suzanne Tamim (born 1977), singer
Hiba Tawaji (born 1987), singer, actress, director 
Lidya Tchakerian (born 1959), painter
Nadia Tueni (1935–1983), poet
Samira Toufik (born 1931), singer, actress

W 
 Haifa Wehbe (born in 1972), Lebanese singer

Y
Paola Yacoub (born 1966), painter, photographer
Tina Yamout (born 1987), singer-songwriter

Z
Nazira Zain al-Din (born 1908), poet, scholar
Elissa Zakaria (born 1972), singer
Maya Zankoul (born 1986), writer, visual artist, blogger
Salwa Zeidan (active since 1988), painter, sculptor
Lamia Ziadé (born 1968), illustrator, visual artist, based in Paris
May Ziade (born 1886), poet, essayist and translator
Nawal Al-Zoghbi (born 1971), singer

-
Lebanese
Artists, women
Artists